Kamen Kostov Kostadinov (26 September 1970 – 28 August 2022) was a Bulgarian politician. Kostadinov was born on 26 September 1970. He attended the Veliko Tarnovo University. Kostadinov served as a member of the National Assembly of Bulgaria from 2005 to 2009. He also worked as a lawyer. Kostadinov died in August 2022, at the age of 51.

References 

1970 births
2022 deaths
21st-century Bulgarian politicians
21st-century Bulgarian lawyers
People from Shumen
Members of the National Assembly (Bulgaria)
Movement for Rights and Freedoms politicians